Hadar may refer to:

 Beta Centauri, a star
 Hadar (narrowboat), a working narrow boat on UK canals

Places
 Hadar, Ethiopia
 Hadar HaCarmel, Haifa, Israel
 Hadar, Hod HaSharon, Israel
 Tell Hadar, an archaeological site on the eastern coast of the Sea of Galilee
 Hadar, Iran (disambiguation)
 Hadar, Nebraska, US
 Hader, Quneitra Governorate, Syria, also spelt Hadar

People
 Hadar (name)

See also
 Hadad (Bible), several biblical characters, also known as Hadar